NIKStewart (who rebranded her name from Treveen Stewart) is a model from the Cayman Islands. In 2013, she was the first winner of the Caribbean's Next Top Model competition to come from the Cayman Islands. Born in Grand Cayman, Stewart moved to Jamaica in fifth grade and then returned to the Cayman Islands for high school. She won a regional modeling contest at 15 which allowed her to sign with a US modeling agency. In 2015, she landed a deal with Nike and works in New York and Chicago for them. Her other campaign work includes Fila, bMobile, Kohls and Rock & Republic.

References

Year of birth missing (living people)
Caymanian beauty pageant winners
Living people